Beggsboro A.F.C.is an Irish association football club based in Cabra, Dublin. They were founded in 1938. The club plays at Kilkiernan Road. Beggsboro compete in the Leinster Senior League. The club competed in the 2013 FAI Cup, but did not make it out of the first round.

Honours
FAI Junior Cup
Winners: 1983–84: 1
Runners Up: 1987–88: 1

References

Leinster Senior League (association football) clubs
Association football clubs in Dublin (city)
1938 establishments in Ireland